Kahatapitiya is a village in Sri Lanka. It is located within Central Province.

See also
List of towns in Central Province, Sri Lanka
It is very old sri lankan surname of sabaragamuwa province people.

External links

Populated places in Central Province, Sri Lanka